Joe's Bridge is the nickname given to Bridge No.9 on the Bocholt-Herentals Canal outside the town of Neerpelt, in the Belgian city of Lommel just south of the Belgian-Dutch border. The bridge was captured by British troops in September 1944, becoming the springboard for the ground offensive of Operation Market-Garden.

Capture
The original bridge had been destroyed by the Belgian Army in 1940, but the Germans had constructed a wooden pontoon bridge to the west of it. This bridge was taken on the evening of 10 September 1944 by the Irish Guards under the command of Lieutenant-Colonel J.O.E Vandeleur. While the Welsh Guards engaged the German forces around Hechtel, the Irish Guards advanced rapidly north-east through the villages of Aksel, Overpelt and Neerpelt, and launched their combined infantry-tank assault, with artillery support, from the grounds of the zinc processing factory in Overpelt. They succeeded in taking the bridge undamaged.

The capture of the bridge completed the encirclement of German troops in Hechtel. German units tried for some days to recapture the bridge from the north but were driven off, once with bayonets. Once the bridge was secure, men of the 615th Field Squadron, Royal Engineers, set about repairing it, while the Irish Guards secured a bridgehead along the N69 main road towards Valkenswaard.

Some 3 km to the west, in the center of Lommel, SS troops had placed 40 randomly selected Belgian civilians in the street, at machine gun-point, as a human shield. However, the swift advance of the British from the east prevented a massacre. The Germans held the north side of the canal up to 17 September, apart from the area around the bridge.

The bridge became known as "Joe's Bridge", after Lieutenant–Colonel Joe Vandeleur, or possibly because the Royal Engineers troop who repaired it was known as "Joe's Troop".

Operation Market-Garden
On the afternoon of 17 September 1944 XXX Corps began its advance north along the N69 (soon known as "Hell's Highway" to the American paratroops and "The Club Route" to the British), with tanks of 2nd Irish Guards leading. A heavy bombardment had been made on known enemy positions, but the information was sketchy and numerous elements of the German battle group survived, including SS and Fallschirmjäger troops. The Germans allowed the British tanks to advance along the road while they waited for the lead elements to move parallel to hidden units in the wooded areas to the left of the road. They then opened up with anti-tank guns and knocked out seven lead tanks, so Lieutenant–Colonel Vandeleur, called in airstrikes from rocket-firing Typhoons. This silenced the guns, and the road was cleared of the wreckage by armoured bulldozers, while infantry mopped up, thus setting a pattern for the rest of the advance towards Valkenswaard and Eindhoven.

Post-war

The bridge was rebuilt after World War II and a memorial below the southern edge of the bridge records its famous name. The Irish Guards Memorial is on the northern bank, on a side-road off the road to Valkenswaard.

Today Joe's Bridge is on the "Airborne trail", a 225 km footpath from Lommel to Arnhem, created as a permanent reminder of Operation Market-Garden by the Dutch hiking association "Ollandse Lange Afstand Tippelaars" (OLAT). It was officially opened in September 2004, during the festivities marking the 60th anniversary of the Liberation.

See also
Operation Market-Garden

References

Further reading 
 Israël, J. (1992). De Brug tot Market Garden; Met de bevrijding van Lommel, Overpelt, Neerpelt en Valkenswaard (Dutch), Lokaalhistorisch museum Kempenland, Lommel (1992) .
 Vandeleur, J. O. E. (1967). A Soldier's Story, printed privately for the author by Gale & Polden (1967), ISBN n/a.

External links

 Joe's Bridge with pictures & history. 
 Joe's Bridge eyewitness article (with pictures)
 Additional info regarding Joe's Bridge & the area surrounding during Operation Market–Garden with pictures.

Siegfried Line campaign
1944 in the Netherlands
Bridges in Belgium
Lommel